Dzumsa (dzoms-sa) is a traditional administrative institution of the villages of Lachen and Lachung in North Sikkim, India. It is a self-government system where a headman, known as the 'Pipon', is elected to chair the community where all the disputes are settled in a democratic manner. This system of self-governance was established during the first half of the 19th century in order to provide structure and cohesion for societies and their activities. The traditional system of Dzumsa is still prevalent in North Sikkim.

The reason why this system of self-governance was created in the first place in the beginning of the 19th century is because the locations were too far removed from central authorities in order to apply the normal laws for the region of Sikkim.

The term Dzumsa means "meeting place". The criteria for selecting the Pipon, who would settle all disputes, are as follows: to be the head of a family, be part of the local administration, have wealth and be intelligent.

References

Mangan district